Adalí Montero Ulfe (b. 6 May 1982) is a Peruvian singer-songwriter. For over 15 years, she has sung in the genres of blues, rock, funk. Montero began her career after  and joined the band El Humo. Montero would also lead a short-lived stint in TV as a vocal coach and appearing on the Mexican comedy show Parodiando.

Biography
Adalí Montero Ulfe began her career when she met  at a Karaoke club and impressed him with her cover of Piece of My Heart and she joined his band, El Humo, from 1999 to 2002. Montero, along with Shantal Onetto, Gisela Ponce de León and Gachi Rivero, performed in the Rocío Tovar musical play Feisbuk (Facebook), a parody of modern adolescent romance.

In 2011, she officially debuted as a musician with the release of her album Volver after two years of work.

Montero was one of the Academy Staff for the Peruvian version of Operación Triunfo.

In 2016, Montero found herself the victim of groping by two men in the backseat of a taxi in the La Victoria district of Lima, Peru.

Citations

External links
 

1982 births
Singers from Lima
21st-century Peruvian women singers
21st-century Peruvian singers
Peruvian singer-songwriters
Living people